The 66th Fighter Wing is a disbanded unit of the United States Air Force, last stationed at Chicago Municipal Airport, Illinois. It was withdrawn from the Illinois Air National Guard and inactivated on 31 October 1950.

History

World War II
Established in March 1943 at Norfolk Army Airfield Virginia.  Supervised training of fighter units for overseas duty.

Reorganized and deployed to England, became an intermediate-level command and control organization for VIII Fighter Command with responsibility for fighter-escort groups of Eighth Air Force.   Assigned groups provided fighter escort to B-17 Flying Fortress and B-24 Liberator heavy bomber groups during combat missions over Occupied Europe July 1943 – May 1945.  Inactivated in England, 21 November 1945.

Air National Guard
Allotted to the Illinois Air National Guard to control ANG fighters and bombers in the Upper Midwest region of the United States.  Extended federal recognition and activated on 26 November 1946.

At the end of October 1950, the Air National Guard converted to the wing-base Hobson Plan organization. As a result, the wing was withdrawn from the Illinois ANG and was inactivated on 31 October 1950. The 126th Composite Wing was established by the National Guard Bureau, allocated to the state of Illinois, recognized and activated 1 November 1950; assuming the personnel, equipment and mission of the inactivated 66th Fighter Wing.

Lineage
 Constituted as the 5th Air Defense Wing on 25 March 1943
 Activated on 27 March 1943
 Re-designated 66th Fighter Wing on 3 July 1943.
 Inactivated on 21 November 1945.
 Allotted to the National Guard on 24 May 1946
 Extended federal recognition and activated on 26 November 1946
 Inactivated, and returned to the control of the Department of the Air Force, on 31 October 1950
 Disbanded on 15 June 1983

Assignments
 Eighth Air Force, 27 March 1943
 VIII Fighter Command, 3 July 1943 – 21 November 1945
 Illinois Air National Guard, 26 November 1946 – 31 October 1950

Components

World War II

 4th Fighter Group: 23 July – 4 November 1945
 55th Fighter Group: 14 September 1943 – 23 July 1945
 56th Fighter Group: 15 September – 11 October 1945
 78th Fighter Group: April 1943 – October 1945
 339th Fighter Group: 4 April 1944 – October 1945
 353d Fighter Group: 3 August 1943 – October 1945

 357th Fighter Group, 31 January 1944 – 8 July 1945
 358th Fighter Group, 20 October 1943 – 3 July 1944
 359th Fighter Group: October 1943 – November 1945
 361st Fighter Group: 30 November 1943 – 1 February 1945; April 1945
 479th Fighter Group: 15 May 1944 – 21 November 1945

Illinois Air National Guard
 126th Bombardment Group, 29 June 1947 – 31 October 1950
 169th Fighter Squadron, 21–29 June 1947
 122d Fighter Group, 9 December 1946 – 7 December 1947 (Indiana ANG)
 127th Fighter Group, 29 September 1946 – 31 October 1950 (Michigan ANG)
 128th Fighter Group, 29 June 1948 – 31 October 1950 (Wisconsin ANG)
 112th Bombardment Squadron, 2 December 1946 – 7 December 1947 (Ohio ANG)
 162d Fighter Squadron, 22 November-7 December 1947 (Ohio ANG)
 166th Fighter Squadron, 10 November-7 December 1947 (Ohio ANG)

Stations
 Norfolk Airport, Virginia, 27 March-c. 11 May 1943
 RAF Duxford (AAF-357), England, c. 3 June 1943
 Sawston Hall (AAF-371), England, 20 August 1943
 RAF Troston (AAF-595), England, C. 25 October – 21 November 1945
 Chicago Municipal Airport, Illinois, 26 November 1946 – 31 October 1950

References

 Notes

Bibliography

 
 

066
0066
066
Military units and formations in Illinois
Military units and formations disestablished in 1950